The Tupolev Tu-28 (NATO reporting name Fiddler) was a long-range interceptor aircraft introduced by the Soviet Union in the 1960s. The official designation was Tu-128, but this designation was less commonly used in the West. It was the largest and heaviest fighter ever in service.

Background
In the 1950s, the Soviet Union sought means to defend against nuclear-armed American bombers possibly penetrating its borders (especially its long and vulnerable northern border). Contemporary interceptors, such as the Yakovlev Yak-28P, were able to cover a radius of just a few hundred kilometers flying from northern Soviet bases like Talagi and Savatiya; the newly developed surface-to-air missiles had even shorter range. Considering both, the sheer numbers required to defend a 5,000 km air front were economically impossible to maintain. This left the Soviet Union able to provide a modern air defense only for selected valuable areas. The PVO decided to cover the entire territory, but with a looser defence. In 1955 it placed a requirement for a large area-defense interceptor, that would achieve it with sparse airbases. The PVO requirement called for a supersonic aircraft  with enormous fuel tanks for both a good patrol time and long range, a capable radar, and the most powerful air-to-air missiles possible. The first attempt, although unsuccessful, was the Lavochkin La-250, a 30-tonne interceptor prototype which was the last of the Lavochkin design bureau's aircraft.

Design and development

Iosif Nezval of Tupolev Design Bureau led development of the new interceptor aircraft. The work began in 1958, based on an existing single prototype of the unsuccessful Tu-98 supersonic bomber. The military designation of the interceptor was at first Tu-28, but it was changed in 1963 to Tu-128, identical to the designation used by the OKB.

The Tu-128 had a broad, low/mid-mounted swept wing carrying the main landing gear in wing-mounted pods, and slab tailplanes. Two Lyulka AL-7F-2 turbojet engines were mounted in the fuselage. The two-man crew of pilot and navigator were seated in tandem.

The Tu-128, with its maximum weight of 43 tonnes, was the heaviest fighter to enter service. It was an interceptor with high wing loading, unsophisticated but reliable avionics and poor visibility. It was not an agile aircraft, intended only to combat NATO bombers like the B-52, not engage in dogfights with smaller aircraft.

The interceptor made its initial public appearance in the 1961 Tushino air parade. Western experts, unaware that the bulge on the belly carried testing instruments, mistook it for a large ventral radar for a mixed interceptor/AWACS role. The production version lacked the bulge and had a large nose radome housing a radar, known as RP-S Smerch, having a detection range of about 50 km (31 mi) and a lock-on range of about 40 km (25 mi).

Armament of the Tu-128 was four Bisnovat R-4 air-to-air missiles (known as K-80 during development; NATO reporting name AA-5 'Ash'). Usually two of them were R-4Rs with semi-active radar homing and two were R-4T infrared-homing missiles, with the former on the outer pylons and the latter on the inner underwing pylons. There was no internal weapons bay.

Production of the Tu-128 ended in 1970 with a total of 198 aircraft having been built.

Development of various projects designated Tu-28A, Tu-28-80, Tu-28-100, Tu-138, and Tu-148 were proposed by the Tupolev Design Bureau but all were abandoned.

Operational history
The Tu-128's only publicly reported combat operation was the destruction of NATO reconnaissance balloons. The aircraft remained in service until 1990. Through the 1980s, units armed with the Tu-128 converted to the Mikoyan MiG-31, which features more advanced sensors and weapons.

Variants

Prototype of Tu-28 ('Fiddler-A')
Development test aircraft, one built. OKB designation was 128. In the West, Fiddler-A was used for all the aircraft with twin ventral fins — these included a prototype and a few of initial production (perhaps two planes).
Tu-128 (also known as Tu-28; 'Fiddler-B')
Main version, first deployed operationally in 1964 (or 1966 – sources differ). The military designation was at first Tu-28, but the existing aircraft were renamed in 1963.  The entire weapon complex (aircraft, radar, missiles) was designated Tu-128S-4. In the Western sources, but not in Soviet, often the more precise, but erroneous, designation of this version is mentioned as either Tu-28P or Tu-128P.
Tu-128UT (also known as Tu-28UT)
Training version with an additional cockpit forward of the normal one, in place of a radar. Ten built and four converted from standard interceptors.
Tu-128M
A 1979 modernization of almost all existing aircraft for better interception at low altitude. Development originated in 1970. Engines and airframe were not altered. The full designation of the entire weapons complex was Tu-128S-4M.  It contained a new RP-SM Smerch-M radar, and new missile set: R-4RM plus R-4TM.

Abandoned

Tu-28A
New development, abandoned.
Tu-28-80
Development designation, abandoned.
Tu-28-100
Development designation, abandoned.
Tu-138
New development, abandoned.
Tu-148
New development, variable geometry wings, abandoned.

Operators

 Soviet Air Defence Forces (never exported)

Specifications (Tu-128)

See also

Notes

References

External links

Tu-0028
1960s Soviet fighter aircraft
Twinjets
Low-wing aircraft
Aircraft first flown in 1961